Atomic Punk, released in Japan as  and in Europe as Dynablaster, is a video game released for the Game Boy in 1990 by Hudson Soft, as part of the Bomberman series. It was the first game of the series to be released on the Game Boy.

There are four modes of gameplay in Atomic Punk, including two single player modes and two multiplayer game modes.

Irem also released the first Bomberman arcade game and its sequel under the Atomic Punk name.

Game A
Gameplay in the first mode, "Game A" (known as "Bomber Boy" in the Japanese version) is similar to other games in the series, with a few differences. Power-ups, known as panels, which are usually gained in each level and carried over from one to the next, can also be bought from a store by using GP, which is collected depending on how much time it takes to complete a level and how many blocks are destroyed. At the beginning of each round, the player decides which panels to use to complete the round. Another difference is that the linear gameplay of the original, with the player advancing levels after completing each one, was changed to implement a world map with nine locations.

My Town is the map location where the panel store is located. The following panels are available from the beginning of the game:
 Elixir (cost 100 GP), which revives Bomberman should he die in a stage
 Bomb Up (cost 50 GP), which allows Bomberman to have an extra bomb on the playfield at a time
 Fire Up (cost 50 GP), which causes explosions to lengthen by one square

The other map locations are those in which the game action takes place. Each area has a set number of rounds that have to be completed to finish the area. With the exception of Faria, these areas can be played in any order, but one area must be completed before moving onto another. Each area, when completed, unlocks a new panel for sale at the My Town store. The panels that can be unlocked include:
 Speed Up (cost 20 GP), which slightly increases the speed at which Bomberman moves
 Remocon (cost 30 GP), which enables bombs to be detonated by remote control
 Wall Pass (cost 50 GP), which enables Bomberman to pass through bombable walls
 Bomb Pass (cost 40 GP), which enables Bomberman to pass through the bombs he has laid
 Timer (cost 50 GP), which slows down the timer, essentially increasing the amount of time available to complete the round
 Fire Pass (cost 100 GP), which makes Bomberman immune to blasts from his bombs

The circle-shaped panels (Bomb Up, Fire Up, Speed Up) are permanent and last until you "lose a kid" (die). All the rest are square-shaped panels and they last for only one round.

Game B
The second game mode, "Game B" (known as "Bomber Man" in the Japanese version) is the same as that in the original Bomberman game, but the stage area is squared rather than rectangular and the screen is always centered on Bomberman rather than scrolling when he touches the border.

Vs. Mode
There are two games in Vs. Mode:
 Panel Mode, in which players begin with only one bomb to place at a time and a bomb blast length of one unit, and Bomb Up and Fire Up panels appear.
 Powerful Mode, in which players have four bombs to place at a time and a bomb blast length of four units, and no panels appear.

Reception
Mean Machines gave Atomic Punk a score of 81, praising the game as a "highly addictive" port of Bomberman, and added that the password system was a welcome addition.

References

1990 video games
Bomberman
Game Boy games
Game Boy-only games
Hudson Soft games
Multiplayer and single-player video games
Video games developed in Japan
Video games scored by Jun Chikuma
Puzzle video games